Peshawar mosque attack may refer to:

2013 Peshawar mosque attack
2015 Peshawar mosque attack
2022 Peshawar mosque attack
2023 Peshawar mosque bombing